The War Is Over may refer to:

 The War Is Over (1966 film), a French film directed by Alain Resnais
 The War Is Over (1945 film), a Canadian newsreel short
 The War Is Over: The Best of Phil Ochs, an album by Phil Ochs
 The War Is Over (Josh Baldwin album) (2017)
 "The War Is Over" (Kelly Clarkson song) (2011)
 "The War Is Over" (Phil Ochs song) (1968)
 "Happy Xmas (War Is Over)", a 1971 song by John Lennon and Yoko Ono